Martin Dobrizhoffer (7 September 1717 – 17 July 1791) was an Austrian Roman Catholic missionary and writer.

Biography
Dobrizhoffer was born in Frymburk (Friedberg), Bohemia. He joined the Society of Jesus in 1736, and in 1749 proceeded to Paraguay, where for eighteen years he worked devotedly first among the Guaranis, and then among the Abipones. Returning to Europe, on the expulsion of the Jesuits from South America, he settled at Vienna, obtained the friendship of Maria Theresa, survived the suppression of his order, and wrote the history of his mission.  He died in Vienna in 1791.

Book
The book on which his claim to fame rests, "An Account of the Abipones, an Equestrian People of Paraguay" was found in Vienna in 1784 in the author's own Latin, and in a German translation by Professor Kreil of the University of Pest. Of its contents some idea may be obtained from its extended title:
Historia de Abiponibus, equestri bellicosaque Paraquariae natione, locupletata copiosis barbarorum gentium, urbium, fluminum, ferarum,  amphibiorum, insectorum, serpentium praecipuorum, piscium, avium, arborum, plantarum aliarumque ejusdem provinciae proprietatum observationibus

The work, published in three volumes, London, 1822, there appeared in London, an anonymous English translation sometimes ascribed to Southey, but really the work of Sara Coleridge, who had undertaken the task to defray the college expenses of one of her brothers. A delicate compliment was paid to the translator by Southey in the third canto of his A Tale of Paraguay, the story of which was derived from the pages of Dobrizhoffer's narrative:

Southey did, however, write a 36-page article about the topic in the January 1822 edition of the Quarterly Review, pp.277-324.

Early map of Paraguay
Published in Vienna, 1780, "Mappa Paraquariae", one of the most important early maps of the region, engraved by Franz Assner.

References

External links 

1717 births
1791 deaths
People from Český Krumlov District
People from the Kingdom of Bohemia
German Bohemian people
18th-century Austrian Jesuits
Austrian Roman Catholic missionaries
Jesuit missionaries in Paraguay
Austrian expatriates in Paraguay
Austrian male writers
Ethnographers